Candesha Scott (born 13 January 1997) is a Grenadian javelin thrower. She became the National Record holder at the discipline at the 2016 Carifta Games with a throw of 51.13m. She Qualified to compete at the 2016 IAAF World U20 Championships in Bydgoszcz, Poland where she failed to qualify for the final of women's javelin. Scott finished 13th overall recording her best throw on the second attempt of her allotted three, throwing 47.86 meters. She has since gained admission into the Central Arizona College.

Combined Event Personal bests

Competition record

See also
 List of javelin throwers

References

External links

1997 births
Living people
Grenadian female javelin throwers